The 2018 Presidential Tour of Turkey was a road cycling stage race that took place between 9 and 14 October 2018 in Turkey. It was be the 54th edition of the Presidential Tour of Turkey and the thirty-fifth event of the 2018 UCI World Tour.

Teams
Twenty teams started the race. Each team had a maximum of seven riders:

Route

General classification

References

2018 UCI World Tour
2018 in Turkish sport
Presidential Cycling Tour of Turkey by year
October 2018 sports events in Turkey